Drysdale is a census-designated place (CDP) in Yuma County, Arizona, United States. The population was 272 at the 2010 census.

Geography
Drysdale is located at  (32.645234, −114.706782).

Demographics

As of the 2010 census, there were 272 people living in the CDP: 130 male and 142 female. 98 were 19 years old or younger, 50 were ages 20–34, 43 were between the ages of 35 and 49, 50 were between 50 and 64, and the remaining 31 were aged 65 and above. The median age was 59.0 years.

The racial makeup of the CDP was 55.9% White, 1.8% American Indian, and 42.3% Other.  90.8% of the population were Hispanic or Latino of any race.

There were 74 households in the CDP, 62 family households (83.8%) and 12 non-family households (16.2%), with an average household size of 3.68. Of the family households, all 50 were married couples living together, while the non-family households included 10 adults living alone: 7 male and 3 female.

The CDP contained 84 housing units, of which 74 were occupied and 10 were vacant.

References

Census-designated places in Yuma County, Arizona